The Xiangshan Visitor Center is a visitor center overlooking Sun Moon Lake in Yuchi Township, Nantou County, Taiwan.

History
The center was constructed in 2010.

Architecture
The center was designed by architect Dan Norihiko with a theme of promoting the harmonious integration between human habitation and the natural world.

See also
 List of tourist attractions in Taiwan

References

2010 establishments in Taiwan
Buildings and structures completed in 2010
Visitor centers in Nantou County